The Bangladesh Army has had women in the officer ranks since it's inception in 1971, though women could join as doctors only. Women were not allowed to join as ordinary soldiers till the early part of the 2010s decade. In 2013, it was announced in newspapers through recruitment advertisement that women would be recruited as ordinary soldiers in the Army's Medical Corps. In 2015, the country got trained female soldiers for the first time. On the other hand, women can be commissioned in various arms and services of the army since the early 2000s decade.

Now women can become both soldiers and officers in every corps of the Bangladesh Army except the infantry, artillery and armored corps though women are commissioned in the artillery.

History

Liberation war of 1971
Bangladesh Army was created in 1971 in the Bangladesh Liberation War, and one female officer from the Pakistan Army's Medical Corps participated in the war, she was Captain Sitara Begum, who was awarded the Bir Protik medal; she was commissioned into the Pakistan Army Medical Corps as a lieutenant in 1970. She took part in the Bangladesh Liberation War in 1971, after being in the Cumilla Cantonment. She was also the commanding officer of a field hospital shortly after the war started.

21st century
21st century saw women's induction as officers other than the medical corps in the army and also females are able to join as ordinary soldiers from 2010s.

Suraiya Rahman was the first female officer to get the rank of brigadier, she was from the Medical Corps. Susane Giti was promoted to major-general in 2018, she was also from the Medical Corps.

Women were only allowed to join the Medical Corps till the early 2000s decade, from this decade women are allowed to join every corps and regiments as officers like men though infantry and armored corps didn't take women. Zannatul Ferdous became the first female paratrooper in 2013 who was commissioned in December, 2008 from the 59th Bangladesh Military Academy long course. In 2019, four female officers were made lieutenant colonels and were appointed commanding officers of artillery regiments and engineers battalion, they were Sanjida Hossain (Artillery), Syeda Nazia Raihan (Artillery), Farhana Afrin (Artillery), and Sarah Amir (Engineers). Colonel Nazma Begum was the first female contingent commander in United Nations Peacekeeping Mission, she went to UNOCI in 2016 with a 56 member contingent; as a lieutenant colonel she was the first female commanding officer of the 21st Field Ambulance of the Bangladesh Army.

Women were not allowed to join as ordinary soldiers, but from 2013 women as ordinary soldiers were being recruited, primarily they were taken in the Medical Corps, and the first batch of Medical Corps soldier recruits completed their basic military training in 29 January 2015, with a training period of 1 year. In this batch, total 879 females were enlisted as ordinary soldiers in the army. In this year, the army got first female pilots, two women named Nazia Nusrat Hossain and Shahrina Binte Anwar became pilots; Nazia was commissioned in the corps of engineers and Shahrina was commissioned in the ordnance corps, both were commissioned in December 2009, both of them completed their first solo flying training successfully in June, 2015.

By corps

See also
Women in Bangladesh
Women in the military by country

References

External links
 

Bangladesh Army
Women in Bangladesh
History of women in Bangladesh
Bangladesh